Neoeuxesta fumicosta is a species of ulidiid, or picture-winged, fly in the genus Neoeuxesta; it is found in Samoa.

References

Ulidiidae
Taxa named by John Russell Malloch
Endemic fauna of Samoa
Insects described in 1930